Tasch Peak is a rocky peak in the southeast portion of Mount Rees, in the Crary Mountains of Marie Byrd Land, Antarctica. Mapped by United States Geological Survey (USGS) from surveys and U.S. Navy tricamera aerial photographs, 1959–66. Named by Advisory Committee on Antarctic Names (US-ACAN) for Paul Tasch, United States Antarctic Research Program (USARP) geologist in the Sentinel Range and Ohio Range, summer 1966–67, and Coalsack Bluff, 1969–70.

References

Mountains of Marie Byrd Land
Crary Mountains